Plato is a lava-filled lunar impact crater on the Moon. Its diameter is 101 km. It was named after ancient Greek philosopher Plato. It is located on the northeastern shore of the Mare Imbrium, at the western extremity of the Montes Alpes mountain range. In the mare to the south are several rises collectively named the Montes Teneriffe. To the north lies the wide stretch of the Mare Frigoris. East of the crater, among the Montes Alpes, are several rilles collectively named the Rimae Plato.

The age of Plato is about 3.84 billion years, only slightly younger than the Mare Imbrium to the south. The rim is irregular with 2-km-tall jagged peaks that project prominent shadows across the crater floor when the Sun is at a low angle. Sections of the inner wall display signs of past slumping, most notably a large triangular slide along the western side. The rim of Plato is circular, but from the Earth it appears oval due to foreshortening.

The flat floor of Plato has a relatively low albedo, making it appear dark in comparison to the surrounding rugged terrain. The floor is free of significant impact craters and lacks a central peak. However, there are a few small craterlets scattered across the floor.

Plato has developed a reputation for transient lunar phenomena, including flashes of light, unusual colour patterns, and areas of hazy visibility. These anomalies are likely a result of seeing conditions, combined with the effects of different illumination angles of the Sun.

Gallery

Satellite craters

By convention these features are identified on lunar maps by placing the letter on the side of the crater midpoint that is closest to Plato.

The following craters have been renamed by the IAU:
 Plato A — See Bliss (crater).

Plato in fiction
The crater Plato is the location of an observatory in Arthur C. Clarke's novel Earthlight (1955), of the lunar "warren" Hong Kong Luna in Robert A. Heinlein's novel The Moon Is a Harsh Mistress (1966), and of Moonbase Alpha in the science-fiction TV series Space: 1999.

Crater Plato is the home crater of Matthew Looney and Maria Looney, protagonists of the Looney series of children's books set on the Moon, written by Jerome Beatty.

References

External links
Plato at The Moon Wiki

 From LROC:
 Balcony Over Plato
 Bench Crater in Plato
 Scalelike Impact Melts
 Lunar Orbiter Photo Number IV-127-H3
 Pictures of Plato on SkyTrip.de
 High resolution lunar overflight video by Seán Doran, based on LRO data, that passes over Plato about two thirds of the way through (see album for more)

Related articles
  - one of the prominent features of the photo includes Plato
 
 
 

Impact craters on the Moon